Kurt H. Thoma (December 2, 1883 – June 5, 1972) was an American Oral Surgeon known as the founder of the American Board of Oral Pathology. He was also the Editor-in-chief for the Oral Surgery, Oral Medicine, Oral Pathology, and Oral Radiology Journal for 22 years. To many Kurt was recognized as the Father of Oral and maxillofacial pathology and the defender of Oral and maxillofacial surgery and a great teacher of Oral medicine .

Life
He was born in Basel, Switzerland and attended the Institute of Technology in Switzerland where he studied architecture. He eventually moved to USA in 1908 and received his dental degree from Harvard School of Dental Medicine in 1911. He then returned to Switzerland to learn usage of Procaine in Dental anesthesia. He returned to United States later on and served as Professor of Oral Pathology and Oral Surgery at Harvard. He also taught at Boston University and Pennsylvania Dental School. He served as the editor in chief for Oral Surgery, Oral Medicine and Oral Pathology for 22 years.

Dr. Thoma wrote several textbooks and wrote over 300 scientific articles during his career. Thoma was consultant for the United States Public Health Service, the Veterans Administration, Walter Reed Army Medical Center and Armed Forces Institute of Pathology. He was the oral surgeon to the Brooks Hospital in Brookline, Massachusetts for 50 years and was on staff of many Boston area hospitals. In 1912, he married Louise Bird and they had two children, Kurt Richard Thoma and Richard S. Alles.

Textbooks
 Oral Anesthesiology, 1914
 Oral Abscesses, 1916
 Oral Roentgenology, 1917
 Teeth, Diet and Health, 1923
 Clinical Pathology of the Jaws 1925, 
 Oral Diagnosis and Treatment Planning, 1936
 Oral Pathology, 1941
 Oral Surgery, 1948 (The C. V. Mosby Company)

Awards and positions
 Professor of Oral Surgery - Henry M. Goldman School of Dental Medicine
 Professor of Oral Surgery & Pathology - Harvard Dental School
 Professor of Oral Surgery - University of Pennsylvania School of Dental Medicine 
 American Board of Oral Pathology - Founder
 American Academy of Oral Pathology - President
 Omicron Kappa Upsilon - President
 Professor Emeritus - Harvard Dental School 
 Curator- Harvard Dental Museum 
 Oral Surgery, Oral Medicine and Oral Pathology Journal - Editor in Chief (1948-1970)
 American Academy of Dental Science - President
 Harvard Odontological Society - President
 Royal College of Surgeons of Edinburgh and England - Fellowship
 Jarvie Award
 Alfred Fones Medal
 Pierre Fauchard Medal
 Tomes Lectureship of Royal College of Surgeons

References

1883 births
1972 deaths
American dentists
American dentistry academics
Harvard School of Dental Medicine alumni
20th-century dentists
Swiss emigrants to the United States